NewsRadio is an American sitcom television series that aired on NBC from March 21, 1995 to May 4, 1999, focusing on the work lives of the staff of a New York City AM news radio station. It had an ensemble cast featuring Dave Foley, Stephen Root, Andy Dick, Maura Tierney, Vicki Lewis, Joe Rogan, Khandi Alexander, and Phil Hartman in his final regular role before his death in 1998; Jon Lovitz joined the show after Hartman's death.

The series was created by executive producer Paul Simms and was filmed in front of a studio audience at CBS Studio Center and Sunset Gower Studios. The theme song was composed by Mike Post, who also scored the pilot.

Overview
The series is set at WNYX, a fictional AM broadcasting all-news radio station in New York City, populated by an eccentric station owner and staff. The show begins with the arrival of a new news director, the everyman Dave Nelson (Dave Foley). While Dave turns out to be more experienced than his youthful appearance suggests, he never fully gains control of his co-workers.

The fast-paced scripts and ensemble cast combined physical humor and visual gags with quick-witted dialogue and farcical storylines. Plots often involved satirical takes on historical events, news stories, and pop culture references. The third and fourth season finales took the surrealism to the extreme, setting the characters in outer space and aboard the Titanic.

There are a total of 97 episodes. Reruns continued in syndication for several years before disappearing in most markets, but the show has aired on A&E, Nick at Nite, and TBS network in the United States, and DTour and the Comedy Network in Canada. In the United States, the show occasionally airs as a filler on WGN America and runs regularly on Reelz and Antenna TV. For several years starting in July 2007, the program was syndicated through The Program Exchange.

Episodes

Characters

Main

 Dave Nelson (Dave Foley) is WNYX's news director, described as a "Midwesterner out of place in New York and pointedly young for such a responsible job". He was raised in Wisconsin, although he was born in Canada. Dave has a number of talents that the other staff members consider embarrassing, including tap dancing, acting work in high school, participation in an all-male a cappella group, knife throwing, and ventriloquism. He also has a very friendly, formal, and easy-going personality, which contrasts with the more lively personalities of the other characters and the farcical situations that occur on the show. He frequently has phone conversations with his mother and keeps a picture of her in his desk. He has an overwhelming coffee addiction, as well as a strong passion for television and classic sitcoms, particularly Green Acres and Mister Ed. Dave has an inexplicable "obsession", as Lisa calls it, with the America song "A Horse with No Name". 
 Jimmy James (Stephen Root) is the station's extroverted, playful billionaire owner. His name comes from the Beastie Boys song Jimmy James. Despite owning a vast corporate empire, he seems to enjoy micromanaging WNYX. He acts as a father figure toward his employees, often helping them learn life lessons. Recurring gags associated with Mr. James include his search for a wife (for which he keeps an extensive list of potential "wife candidates"), his infatuation with Dave's mother, his inability to act, his rivalries with other wealthy entrepreneurs (such as Ted Turner and Bill Gates), and his considerable inside knowledge of conspiracies and government cover-ups; he claims to have been Deep Throat and is at one point suspected to have been the infamous aircraft hijacker D. B. Cooper. In the show's series finale, Mr. James "retires" to New Hampshire, where he buys a news radio station and newspaper, taking most of the WNYX staff with him.
 Matthew Brock (Andy Dick) is a news reporter. Superficially clumsy, naive, and immature, he is the butt of many physical jokes on the show; he is often seen tripping, falling, flying over furniture, or handling electronics that explode or catch fire. Matthew idolizes Bill, who bullies him in return. Later in the series, he displays an affinity for science fiction and fantasy media. Matthew holds a degree in dentistry — and appears to be a very competent dental practitioner — but prefers radio journalism, despite the fact he is very often shown to be truly inept at it. He develops a crush on Lisa. He initially dislikes Max, seeing him as an interloper who is trying to take Bill's place, and believes himself to be Bill's rightful successor, but eventually grows to like him.
 Lisa Miller (Maura Tierney), with whom Dave has an intermittent relationship, serves as reporter, on-air personality, producer, and news director briefly in the series. An obsessive overachiever, Lisa can instantly perform complex mathematical calculations and keeps a detailed life-plan. She frequently brags about her SAT scores and retakes the exam well out of college. Also, she gets turned on if she yells too much. Lisa was born in Boston, living there until the age of seven when her family moved to Connecticut. She represses a working-class Boston accent, which results in her having a sibilant "S" while speaking. During the first two seasons of the show, she is in regular contact with her ex-boyfriend Stuart, with the suggestion that they might still be in love. In season five, she marries Jimmy's archenemy Johnny Johnson (played by Patrick Warburton).
 Beth (Vicki Lewis) is Dave's secretary. She wears ridiculous, often midriff-baring outfits, has bright red hair, and chews gum. Her salary is often the subject of jokes; characters frequently point out that she "earns next to nothing". Her first name comes from the Kiss song "Beth", and she claims that she does not have a last name. In the third season DVD commentary, the writers revealed they had planned to have Jimmy adopt Beth as his daughter, but felt there was never a right time for it.
 Joe Garrelli (Joe Rogan) is the station's street-smart electrician and handyman. He is notorious for his seemingly nonchalant approach to his profession. Believing that consumer products are "rip-offs", he is known to personally craft his own supplies (such as homemade duct tape) and gadgets for others around the office (among many a stun gun, a white noise machine and a two-way radio). He also espouses various conspiracy theories, particularly with regard to the government's suppression of information about extraterrestrial life. Throughout the series, he displays an infatuation with Catherine Duke. On several occasions, the other employees at the station speculate that Joe might have been the Unabomber. The character of Joe was originally named Rick, and was played by Greg Lee in the pilot episode. Ray Romano was originally cast to play Joe, but was replaced because his style of verbal comedy did not mesh well with the fast-paced wit of the rest of the cast.
 Catherine Duke (Khandi Alexander) is the second of WNYX's news anchors. She is often bitter rivals with co-anchor Bill McNeal; according to Bill, this is partly due to an office affair they had years earlier. When she was younger she worked with her uncle and learned how to perform and identify numerous scams, such as Three-card Monte. She is well known for slapping her co-workers in the event words don't express her contempt for a certain situation. Catherine is noted for being direct with people, though she is willing to use her charms to get her way. Catherine leaves the station to take a job in London during the fourth season. She makes a brief appearance in the fifth-season premiere for Bill's funeral. The role of Catherine was played by Ella Joyce in the pilot episode.

 Evelyn William "Bill" McNeal (Phil Hartman) is a news co-anchor for WNYX. Loud, arrogant, and free-spirited, Bill is frequently a thorn in the news director's side. His relationships are often unorthodox or contentious. He often displays jarring gaps in knowledge. Another running joke in the show has Bill describing painful stories with an air of cheerful nostalgia, often wistfully saying, "good times, good times". Bill occasionally shows flashes of concern and wisdom for his co-workers, whom he perceives as friends. Hartman's death during the production hiatus after the fourth season is addressed in the first episode of the fifth season, where his character is revealed to have died of a sudden heart attack. An issue of Radio Ink magazine displaying Hartman on its cover was subsequently displayed in Dave's office as a tribute to the actor and character following his death. Bill is shown reading from said issue in the season four episode “Who’s the Boss?”
 Max Lewis (Jon Lovitz) is Bill McNeal's replacement in season five. He is socially awkward, neurotic and terrible at his job. Max has a penchant for redheads, and Beth in particular, but she quickly ends up despising him. He says that Max Louis is not his true identity, because he uses a different persona every time he gets a new job. Max gets the job at WNYX because he is an old colleague of Bill's, a plot point that reflects the real-life fact that Jon Lovitz took the role in NewsRadio out of friendship with Phil Hartman. When asked why he joined NewsRadio, Lovitz said that he's "doing this for Phil. There's nothing more to say." Lovitz first appeared on "Our Fiftieth Episode" when Bill meets him in a mental ward going by the name Fred. Fred later admits he is really an air traffic controller who periodically and voluntarily "flips out" and goes into the mental ward for a vacation from making decisions. Lovitz returned a second time in the fourth season opener "Jumper". In the episode, Lovitz plays Mike Johnson, a disgruntled former employee who has been fired and is threatening to commit suicide by jumping from the ledge outside Dave's office.

Recurring 
The only recurring character to appear in more than one production season is that of Jimmy's lawyer, Roger, played initially by Norm Macdonald, and later by NewsRadio writer Drake Sather, who did a vocal impersonation of Norm Macdonald.

Several other actors appeared in multiple seasons playing different characters, notably Lovitz, David Cross, Toby Huss, Brian Posehn, David Anthony Higgins, Dave Allen, Wallace Langham, and Bob Odenkirk.

Tone Lōc and Toby Huss played security guards Lorenzo and Junior in two episodes in season 2. The characters were based on the security guards at the studio where NewsRadio was shot. During the last season, Patrick Warburton had a recurring role as Johnny Johnson, Jimmy's nemesis and Lisa's love interest (and eventual husband).

Lauren Graham had a four-episode run as Andrea, a manipulative efficiency expert who shakes up the office (firing Matthew, demoting Dave, and promoting Lisa). She is sometimes referred to as "Planbee" after Matthew misunderstands her being Jimmy's "Plan B" for the office. In a season 4 episode commentary track, Tierney gives the hiring of Graham as a possible explanation for Alexander's departure, which contradicts the idea that Alexander intended to leave before Graham appeared on the show (In Dave Foley's appearance on Joe Rogan's podcast, they talked about Alexander leaving because she was not given enough lines). All of the changes introduced during Graham's time on the show would be restored by mid-season to the way things were before her arrival.

Brad Rowe had a four-episode run as Walt the intern, Jimmy's nephew who has a crush on Lisa, which causes more worry for Dave. He was originally intended as a regular for season five, but the character made no appearances after "Sinking Ship".

Syndication

The show entered off-network syndication three months after the fourth-season finale. In October 2000, A&E picked up the rights to the show and eventually moved to The Biography Channel in 2003.

In Canada, the show aired on CTV Comedy Channel from 2011 to 2013. In October 2013, the show began airing on the Canadian TV channel M3. In the UK, the show aired on Comedy Central in the late 1990s, and has aired on Sony TV since April 2011. In Australia, NewsRadio was broadcast on Network 10 since 1997. From 2011, 7mate has been showing reruns of the series. It was also shown in New Zealand on TVNZ.

Home media
Sony Pictures Home Entertainment released all 5 seasons of NewsRadio on DVD in Region 1 between 2005 and 2007. Each set includes multiple audio commentaries with creator Paul Simms, the writers and actors. The DVD sets also include special features such as gag reels and other featurettes. As of 2014, these releases have been discontinued and are out of print.

On August 27, 2013, it was announced that Mill Creek Entertainment had acquired the rights to various television series from the Sony Pictures library including Newsradio. They subsequently re-released the first two seasons on DVD on April 1, 2014.

On May 19, 2015, Mill Creek Entertainment re-released NewsRadio - The Complete Series on DVD in Region 1.

Nielsen ratings
Though the series received critical acclaim, ratings were inconsistent, and the show never placed higher than 26th. During its run, NewsRadios time slot changed 11 times.

On its first two broadcasts the show received a 20 share, improving on its lead-in (Wings) by a percentage point, and beating its competitors (Under One Roof and Thunder Alley) in its share of the 18- to 49-year-old audience.

Season ratings

References

External links

 
 NewsRadio and the Comedic Art
 An Oral History of News Radio

1995 American television series debuts
1999 American television series endings
1990s American workplace comedy television series
1990s American sitcoms
English-language television shows
Television series about radio
Television series about journalism
NBC original programming
Television series by Sony Pictures Television
Television shows set in Manhattan
Television shows filmed in Los Angeles
Television series by Brad Grey Television